Lloyd Benedict Nolan (August 11, 1902 – September 27, 1985) was an American film and television actor. Among his many roles, Nolan is remembered for originating the role of private investigator Michael Shayne in a series of 1940s B movies.

Biography
Nolan was born in San Francisco, California, the youngest of three children of Margaret, who was of Irish descent, and James Nolan, an Irish immigrant who was a shoe manufacturer. He attended Santa Clara Preparatory School and Stanford University, flunking out of Stanford as a freshman "because I never got around to attending any other class but dramatics." His parents disapproved of his choice of a career in acting, preferring that he join his father's shoe business, "one of the most solvent commercial firms in San Francisco."

Nolan served in the United States Merchant Marine before joining the Dennis Players theatrical troupe in Cape Cod. He began his career on stage and was subsequently lured to Hollywood, where he played mainly doctors, private detectives, and policemen in many film roles.

Film career
Nolan's obituary in the Los Angeles Times contained the evaluation, "Nolan was to both critics and audiences the veteran actor who works often and well regardless of his material." Although Nolan's acting was often praised by critics, he was, for the most part, relegated to B pictures. Despite this, Nolan co-starred with a number of well-known actresses, among them Mae West, Dorothy McGuire, and former Metropolitan Opera mezzo-soprano Gladys Swarthout. Under contract to Paramount and 20th Century Fox studios, he essayed starring roles in the late '30s and early-to-mid '40s and appeared as the title character in the Michael Shayne detective series. Raymond Chandler's novel The High Window was adapted from a Philip Marlowe adventure for the seventh film in the Michael Shayne series, Time to Kill (1942); the film was remade five years later as The Brasher Doubloon, truer to Chandler's original story, with George Montgomery as Marlowe.

Most of Nolan's films were light entertainment with an emphasis on action. His most famous include Atlantic Adventure, costarring Nancy Carroll; Ebb Tide; Wells Fargo; Every Day's a Holiday, starring Mae West; Bataan; and A Tree Grows in Brooklyn, with Dorothy McGuire and James Dunn. He also gave a strong performance in the 1957 film Peyton Place with Lana Turner.

Nolan also contributed solid and key character parts in numerous other films. One, The House on 92nd Street, was a startling revelation to audiences in 1945. It was a conflation of several true incidents of attempted sabotage by the Nazi regime (incidents which the FBI was able to thwart during World War II), and many scenes were filmed on location in New York City, unusual at the time. Nolan portrayed FBI Agent Briggs, and actual FBI employees interacted with Nolan throughout the film; he reprised the role in a subsequent 1948 movie, The Street with No Name.

One of the last of his many military roles was playing an admiral at the start of what proved to be Howard Hughes' favorite film, Ice Station Zebra.

Television and other endeavors
Later in Nolan's career, he returned to the stage and appeared on television to great acclaim in The Caine Mutiny Court-Martial, for which he received a 1955 Emmy award for portraying Captain Queeg, the role made famous by Humphrey Bogart. Nolan also made guest appearances on television shows, including NBC's The Ford Show, Starring Tennessee Ernie Ford, The Bing Crosby Show, a sitcom on ABC and the Emmy-winning NBC anthology series The Barbara Stanwyck Show.

Nolan appeared on Wagon Train in the second season, episode 16, as the title character in “The Hunter Malloy Story”, January 21, 1959.

Nolan appeared three times on NBC's Laramie Western series, as sheriff Tully Hatch in the episode "The Star Trail (1959), as outlaw Matt Dyer in the episode "Deadly Is the Night" (1961) and then as former Union Army General George Barton in the episode "War Hero" (1962). On December 8, 1960, Nolan was cast as Dr. Elisha Pittman, in "Knife of Hate" on Dick Powell's Zane Grey Theatre. In the story line, Dr. Pittman removed one of the legs of Jack Hoyt (Robert Harland) after Hoyt sustained a gunshot wound from which infection was developing. Hoyt wants to marry Susan Pittman (Susan Oliver), but her father is at first unyielding on the matter.

Nolan starred in The Outer Limits episode "Soldier" written by Harlan Ellison. He appeared in the NBC Western Bonanza as LaDuke, a New Orleans detective. In 1967, Strother Martin and he guest-starred in the episode "A Mighty Hunter Before the Lord" of NBC's The Road West series, starring Barry Sullivan. Also in 1967, Nolan was a guest star in the popular Western TV series The Virginian, in the episode "The Masquerade", and in the pilot episode of Mannix.

Nolan co-starred from 1968 to 1971 in the pioneering NBC series Julia, with Diahann Carroll, who was the first African American woman to star in a non-servant role in her own television series.

One of his last appearances was a guest spot as himself in the 1984 episode "Cast in Steele" on the TV detective series Remington Steele.

On February 8, 1960, Nolan received a star on the Hollywood Walk of Fame for his work in the television industry, at 1752 Vine Street.

In his later years, Nolan appeared in commercials for Polident.

Personal life
Nolan married Mell Efrid in 1933. They had a daughter, Melinda, and a son, Jay. The couple remained married until Efrid's death in 1981. Their son had autism, and was institutionalized at a private institution at age 13. He died at age 26 from choking while eating. In 1973, Nolan testified to Congress urging that autism be recognized as a developmental disability. Nolan is credited with having convinced Ronald Reagan to sign California's bill mandating education be provided to children with autism. Nolan founded the Jay Nolan Autistic Center (now known as Jay Nolan Community Services) in honor of his son, Jay, and was chairman of the annual Save Autistic Children Telethon.

In 1983, Nolan married Virginia Dabney, with whom he remained until his death.

Nolan was a lifelong Republican. In 1964, Nolan spoke at the "Project Prayer" rally attended by 2,500 at the Shrine Auditorium in Los Angeles. The gathering, which was hosted by Anthony Eisley, a star of ABC's Hawaiian Eye series, sought to flood the United States Congress with letters in support of mandatory school prayer, following two decisions in 1962 and 1963 of the United States Supreme Court which struck down mandatory school prayer as conflicting with the Establishment Clause of the First Amendment to the United States Constitution. Joining Nolan and Eisley at the rally were Walter Brennan, Rhonda Fleming, Dale Evans, Pat Boone, and Gloria Swanson. At the rally, Nolan asked, "Do we permit ourselves to be turned into a godless people, or do we preserve America as one nation under God?" Eisley and Fleming added that John Wayne, Ronald Reagan, Roy Rogers, Mary Pickford, Jane Russell, Ginger Rogers, and Pat Buttram would also have attended the rally had their schedules not been in conflict. "Project Prayer" was ultimately unsuccessful in its campaign to keep public prayer in public schools.

A long-time cigar and pipe smoker, Nolan died of lung cancer on September 27, 1985, at his home in Brentwood, California; he was 83. He is interred at the Westwood Village Memorial Park Cemetery in Westwood, Los Angeles, California.

Filmography

Film

Television

Radio appearances

References

Further reading
 Lloyd Nolan: An Actor's Life With Meaning, by Joel Blumberg and Sandra Grabman. BearManor Media, Albany, 2010. .

External links

 
 
 
 Lloyd Nolan photos and links

1902 births
1985 deaths
20th-century American male actors
20th Century Studios contract players
American male film actors
American male television actors
American people of Irish descent
American sailors
Burials at Westwood Village Memorial Park Cemetery
California Republicans
Deaths from lung cancer in California
Donaldson Award winners
Male actors from San Francisco
Outstanding Performance by a Lead Actor in a Miniseries or Movie Primetime Emmy Award winners
Paramount Pictures contract players
People from Brentwood, Los Angeles
Stanford University alumni
United States Merchant Mariners